Zodiac Maritime Ltd is an international ship management company. Zodiac is also a large ship owner and charters out these vessels. It is part of Ofer Global, based in Monaco, and the chairman is Eyal Ofer. 

Zodiac was involved in the MSC Napoli, the container ship that ran into difficulty in the English Channel. In late 2009 and early 2010, two of its ships (St James Park and MV Asian Glory) were captured by Somali pirates.

According to a 2014 analysis conducted by Globes, the companies of the Zodiac group generated together an operating profit of just over $1.5 billion in 2003–12, with an operating profit margin of 39%, and a 0.49% tax rate on profits.

In July 2014, Eyal Ofer, the principal of Zodiac Group, received an honorary life membership of the Baltic Exchange for his contribution to shipping in the UK and global maritime trade. Later that year, he was named in the top 10 most influential people in the shipping industry according to Lloyds List 2014.

See also
 July 2021 Gulf of Oman incident
 MV Asian Glory

References

External links
company website

Shipping companies of Monaco
Ofer family